Chelone may refer to:
 Chelone (plant), commonly known as turtleheads
Chelone (Oread), mountain nymph in Greek mythology.Appears in the Aesop's fable Zeus and the Tortoise.
 Chelone formation, Greek term for Testudo formation
 Chelone, a genus of sea turtle in the Cheloniidae family.